Portage Des Sioux is a city in St. Charles County, Missouri, United States. The town sits on the Mississippi River roughly opposite Elsah, Illinois, and is the home of the riverside shrine of Our Lady of the Rivers. The population was 328 at the 2010 census. The French name derives from the overland escape route between the Missouri River and Mississippi River used by a band of Sioux, fleeing enemies; they used this area as a portage for their canoes, outdistancing their rivals who instead paddled all of the way to the confluence of the rivers.

The Treaties of Portage des Sioux in 1815 were signed here ostensibly settling Native American and United States conflicts in the War of 1812. The treaties consolidated and affirmed the Treaty of St. Louis (1804) in which the Sac and Fox ceding northeast Missouri and much of Illinois and Wisconsin and the 1808 Treaty of Fort Clark in which the Osage Nation ceded all of Missouri and Arkansas. These treaties were to ultimately result in the Black Hawk War and the tribes being forced to move west of Missouri.

Geography
Portage Des Sioux is located at  (38.926348, -90.342982).

Demographics

As of 2000 the median income for a household in the city was $38,333, and the median income for a family was $42,321. Males had a median income of $41,875 versus $25,000 for females. The per capita income for the city was $18,693. About 2.8% of families and 2.3% of the population were below the poverty line, including 4.0% of those under age 18 and none of those age 65 or over.

2010 census
As of the census of 2010, there were 328 people, 136 households, and 90 families residing in the city. The racial makeup of the city was 98.5% White, 0.6% from other races, and 0.9% from two or more races. Hispanic or Latino of any race were 1.8% of the population.

There were 136 households, of which 28.7% had children under the age of 18 living with them, 52.2% were married couples living together, 7.4% had a female householder with no husband present, 6.6% had a male householder with no wife present, and 33.8% were non-families. 31.6% of all households were made up of individuals, and 9.5% had someone living alone who was 65 years of age or older. The average household size was 2.41 and the average family size was 3.02.

The median age in the city was 44.3 years. 22% of residents were under the age of 18; 7.6% were between the ages of 18 and 24; 21.3% were from 25 to 44; 38.8% were from 45 to 64; and 10.4% were 65 years of age or older. The gender makeup of the city was 51.2% male and 48.8% female.

Education
Public education in Portage Des Sioux is administered by the Orchard Farm School District.

Portage Des Sioux had a public library, a branch of the St. Charles City-County District Library. It closed after flooding in 2019.

References

External links

 Our Lady of the Rivers Shrine

Cities in St. Charles County, Missouri
Missouri populated places on the Mississippi River
Portages in the United States
French colonial settlements of Upper Louisiana
Cities in Missouri